SM UC-55 was a German Type UC II minelaying submarine or U-boat in the German Imperial Navy during World War I. The U-boat was ordered on 12 January 1916, laid down on 25 February 1916, and was launched on 2 August 1916. She was commissioned into the German Imperial Navy on 15 November 1916 as SM UC-55.

Design
A German Type UC II submarine, UC-55 had a displacement of  when at the surface and  while submerged. The submarine was powered by two six-cylinder four-stroke diesel engines each producing  (a total of ), two electric motors producing , and two propeller shafts.

UC-55 was fitted with six  mine tubes, eighteen UC 200 mines, three  torpedo tubes (one on the stern and two on the bow), seven torpedoes, and one  Uk L/30 deck gun. Her complement was twenty-six crew members.

Service
In 6 patrols UC-55 was credited with sinking 9 ships, either by torpedo or by mines laid.

Loss
UC-55 sailed from Heligoland on 25 September 1917 to lay mines in the Lerwick Channel, the southern approach to the port of Lerwick in the Shetland Islands. On 29 September, just as she started dropping her mines, she suffered a loss of trim which resulted in her diving beyond her rated maximum dive depth. This in turn resulted in the forward compartment flooding, the batteries failing, and chlorine gas developing. She was forced to surface to ventilate the boat, but when she surfaced, the rudder refused to answer the helm due to the lack of battery power. Her captain then gave orders to destroy secret documents and codebooks and set scuttling charges in the mine room and engine room.

A 12-pdr shell from the Sylvia hit the submarine's conning tower, killing her commander, Horst Ruhle von Lilienstern, and a second shell hit the hull and she began to sink, after which two depth charges were dropped right beside the UC-55, resulting in the U-boat blowing up. The Moravia then closed with the wreck, fired two more shots into her, and dropped a final depth charge. Of the submarine's crew, 17 were taken prisoner, and 10 were killed.

Location of Wreck

Summary of raiding history

References

Notes

Citations

Bibliography

 
 
 
 
 

Ships built in Danzig
German Type UC II submarines
U-boats commissioned in 1916
Maritime incidents in 1917
U-boats sunk in 1917
U-boats sunk by mines
World War I minelayers of Germany
World War I shipwrecks in the North Sea
World War I submarines of Germany
1916 ships